Karen Vovovich Sargsyan (born 27 April 1983) is a former Russian professional footballer.

Club career
He made his Russian Football National League debut for FC Mashuk-KMV Pyatigorsk on 27 March 2008 in a game against FC Kuban Krasnodar.

Personal life
His younger brother Movses Sargsyan is also a footballer.

Honours
 Russian Second Division Zone South top scorer: 2007 (22 goals).

External links 
 
 

1983 births
Living people
Russian footballers
FC Dynamo Stavropol players
FC Chernomorets Novorossiysk players
Russian people of Armenian descent
FC Volgar Astrakhan players
FC Sokol Saratov players
FC Armavir players
Association football forwards
FC Avangard Kursk players
FC Mashuk-KMV Pyatigorsk players